Anarbor is the third studio album by American rock band Anarbor released in 2016.

Background
After being on hiatus since 2013, the band posted on Twitter images and video clips of them in the studio. In January 2016, the band had confirmed that the hiatus was over and a new full-length album would be released in 2016.

Track listing

References

2016 albums
Anarbor albums